William Templeman was a Scottish professional footballer who played in the Scottish League for Airdrieonians.

Personal life 
Templeman's brother David was also a footballer. Templeman served in the British Armed Forces during the First World War.

Career statistics

References 

Scottish footballers
Date of death missing
Place of birth missing
Scottish Football League players
Airdrieonians F.C. (1878) players
Year of birth missing
Association football outside forwards
British military personnel of World War I